Love Creeps (2005) is the third novel by American writer Amanda Filipacchi.   It was translated into French, Italian, Dutch, Russian, Polish, and Korean. It tackles issues of love, desire, obsession, and addiction.

Plot summary

Love Creeps is about a woman who has lost her desire - so she decides to emulate her stalker, and become a stalker herself.

Critical reception 
Authors Bret Easton Ellis, Tama Janowitz, and Edmund White provided blurbs, and film director Brian Dannelly said of it: "It's a love story of stalkers in New York.  It's great.  It's the funniest book I've ever read."

Writing for the Boston Globe, Diane White compared Filipacchi's style to that of Muriel Spark and described Love Creeps as "extraordinarily funny".

Awards
U.S.:
Best book of prose: Love Creeps (St. Martin's Press): 2006 Devil's Kitchen Reading Award (Southern Illinois University)Love Creeps was one of The Village Voices top 25 books of 2005.

France:
Best Foreign Novel: Love Creeps (Editions Denoël): Lauriers Verts de La Forêt des Livres (2006)

References

External links
Amanda Filipacchi: Official website

Novels by Amanda Filipacchi
2005 American novels
Absurdist fiction
American satirical novels
Novels set in New York City
St. Martin's Press books